Elena Runggaldier (born 10 July 1990) is an Italian former ski jumper and Nordic combined skier representing G.S. Fiamme Gialle.

Biography
Runggaldier was born in Bolzano, South Tyrol, in northern Italy on 10 July 1990. In 2004, she finished first at the Italian championships of Nordic combined skiing. Also, in 2004 she placed first in the K62 jumping and second in the normal hill jumping of the Italian championships of ski jumping. Further notable results at the Italian titles of ski jumping were: first in 2006 and 2008, second in 2007, 2010, and 2011, and third in 2009.

She made her debut in the Continental Cup, the highest level in women's ski jumping, on 16 January 2005 with 23rd place in Planica. She had three times finished among the top three, with one win and no second place.

She won a silver medal in the 2011 World Championship in Oslo. She also took part in the 2012–13 FIS Ski Jumping World Cup, where she came 20th, the 2013–14 FIS Ski Jumping World Cup where she came 27th, the 2015–16 FIS Ski Jumping World Cup, and the 2016–17 FIS Ski Jumping World Cup.

She represented Italy at the 2014 Winter Olympics, coming 29th in the ski jumping at the Women's normal hill individual event. She again competed for Italy at the 2018 Winter Olympics, coming 33rd in the same event.

Private life
Runggaldier was at one time engaged to Italian nordic skier David Hofer. She is now married to François Braud.

References

1990 births
Competitors at the 2011 Winter Universiade
FIS Nordic World Ski Championships medalists in ski jumping
Italian female Nordic combined skiers
Italian female ski jumpers
Living people
Olympic ski jumpers of Italy
Ski jumpers at the 2014 Winter Olympics
Ski jumpers at the 2018 Winter Olympics
Ski jumpers of Fiamme Gialle
Sportspeople from Bolzano
Universiade gold medalists for Italy
Universiade medalists in ski jumping
20th-century Italian women
21st-century Italian women